Enga Veetu Mapillai is a 2018 Tamil language matchmaking reality television show that aired on Colors Tamil from 20 February 2018 to 17 April 2018 for a total of 41 Episodes.
The show ended on 17 April 2018.

Participants

Episode list

Call out order

 The contestant received the token of love before the rose ceremony
 The contestant received a rose during the date
 The contestant is eliminated in a rose ceremony
 The contestant is eliminated during the date
 The contestant is eliminated outside the rose ceremony
 The contestant quit the competition
 The contestant won the competition

Dubbed version
 This show is dubbed in Malayalam language airing on Flowers TV as Aryakku Parinayam from 26  February 2018 on Monday to Friday at 21:30 (IST).

References

External links
 Colors Tamil Official Facebook in Tamil
 Colors Tamil Official Youtube Channel in Tamil

Colors Tamil original programming
Tamil-language reality television series
2010s Tamil-language television series
2018 Tamil-language television series debuts
Tamil-language game shows
Tamil-language television shows
2018 Tamil-language television series endings